Science Illustrated is a multilingual popular science magazine published by the Swedish publisher Bonnier Publications International A/S.

History and profile
Science Illustrated was launched simultaneously in Denmark, Norway and Sweden in 1984. The Finnish version was started in Helsinki, Finland in 1986. The Norwegian version is based in Oslo.

According to official websites, the magazine – with a total circulation of 370,000 copies – is the biggest in the Nordic countries with a focus on nature, technology, medicine and culture.

Editions

See also
List of Norwegian magazines
List of magazines in Denmark

References

External links
Website of Australian Science Illustrated

1984 establishments in Norway
Illustreret Videnskab
Danish-language magazines
Finnish-language magazines
Magazines established in 1984
Magazines published in Australia
Illustreret Videnskab
Magazines published in Helsinki
Ilustreta Zinatne
Magazines published in Oslo
Magazines published in Sweden
Norwegian-language magazines
Popular science magazines
Science and technology magazines
Swedish-language magazines